Gaius Valerius Catullus ( –  BCE) was a Latin poet and a leading figure of the Neoterics. Catullus and his poetry, comprising 113 poems, have been the subjects of many books and papers in classical studies and other fields, including literary criticism, gender studies, and cultural studies; there are many critical editions, commentaries, translations and student guides of his poetry as well. Even in 1890, Max Bonnet wrote that Catullus was "inundated" with academic publications concerning his life and works. In the early 1970s, Kenneth Quinn wrote, "Scarcely an issue appears of any of the major classical periodicals without at least one article on Catullus; new translations come out almost yearly". More than two thousand publications about Catullus appeared between 1959 and 2003. Denis Feeney has described Catullus 68 alone as having "legions of critics", producing a "labyrinth" of literature. However, expert guidance via specific bibliographies and survey articles remains useful as this index can be inconvenient to use. Curated bibliographies are still important resources even with the rise of online search tools such as Google Scholar. Various bibliographies and literature reviews have attempted to systematically cover books, chapters, articles, dissertations, and other research about Catullus and his poetry to help students and scholars find their way through the literature.

R. G. C. Levens's chapter "Catullus" in Fifty Years of Classical Scholarship and Jean Granarolo's article "" in  both overviewed the state of Catullan scholarship up through the 1950s, prior to R. A. B. Mynors's influential edition for Oxford Classical Texts. The 1958 publication of Mynors's text marked the start of a resurgence of scholarship of Catullus continuing through 1970. The period 1934–1969 in Catullan research is covered by a pair of articles in The Classical World; this journal is known for its bibliographic reports. Quinn's "Trends in Catullan Criticism" was published in the book series  in 1973; this series mostly comprises survey articles, with many devoted to reviews of scholarship on Roman authors. Lustrum, a review journal devoted to comprehensive surveys of classical scholarship, published surveys by Granarolo in 1976 and 1987. Marilyn B. Skinner's 270-page article for Lustrum covers 1985–2015, picking up from Granarolo's earlier publications for the journal; T. P. Wiseman included Skinner's survey as one of a handful of "standard works of Catullan reference". Several Catullan bibliographies exist online; these online resources can be continually updated unlike those in print. David Konstan, a compiler of Oxford Bibliographies Online's bibliography of Catullus, wrote "in the future, online bibliographies [...] will be the rule".

Various kinds of references have been included alongside self-contained bibliographies and research reports on Catullus. Certain books on Catullus have had their references identified as being particularly useful from a bibliographic point of view. Tertiary sources such as 's entry in  also have been cited for their review of past scholarship. Items are added to this list only if other sources have specifically cited them within broader metabibliographic discussion of bibliographies and research surveys of Catullus.

Print

1870s–1890s
 
 Survey of ten publications about Catullus, Tibullus, and Propertius, published 1873–1874, mostly about textual criticism.
 
 Discusses Emil Baehrens's  and 's Q. Valerius Catullus: .
 
 Lists 38 publications, discussion accompanies many but not all of them. Mostly about Catullus, including editions, translations, and scholarship on meter and structure.
 
 Has separate sections for Catullus and Tibullus with 226 entries between them. Each section is divided into subsections.
 
 First part includes more general publications; second includes works on specific parts of Catullan scholarship, for instance textual criticism, meter, or language.
 
 On Catullus and meter.

1900s–1930s

 
 Divided into two sections: the first part includes more general publications and the second includes works on specific parts of Catullan scholarship.
 
 On Catullus and religion.
 
 First part of the survey includes editions, and scholarship on meter, biographies of Catullus, and textual criticism; the second part is about research on the language and grammar in Catullus's works.
 
 Survey comprises four sections, compiling general works, editions, translations, and scholarship on individual poems.
 
 Contemporary book reviews praised its "astonishing bibliography" which were "the most useful parts of the book".
 
 Bibliographic information appears throughout; references to predominantly German scholarship appear in running text.

1940s–1950s

 
 Has publications up through 1940.
 
 Appendix to a chapter on Catullus within a series on Roman literature. Bibliography largely focuses on the prior fifty years. Sections: "", "", "", "", "", "", and "".
 
 Bibliographic paper with 120 footnotes overall. Discussion on Catullus includes sources related to Catullus 51 and Sappho, as well as Catullus 66 and Callimachus.
 
 Contains "substantial bibliographical data". Covers literature through .
 
 Contains discussion and critique. In five sections: "", "", "", "", and "".
 
Includes a list of Spanish translations of Catullus. Section on Catullus largely the same as original 1902 publication, with some editing and a couple entries Menéndez y Pelayo had subsequently compiled.
 
 Part of Büchner's larger report reviewing scholarship on Roman literature from 1937–, largely focusing on work written in German.
 
 Surveys scholarship from the beginning of the 20th century through . Divided into six sections: "Editions"; "Translations"; "Biography"; "Literary History and Criticism"; "Manuscripts and Text"; "Language, Metre and Style". Summarizes conclusions of studies and also gives his own criticisms and evaluations of them. Unrevised, without update, in the second edition.
 
 Wendell Clausen's review of this book said, "Perhaps the most valuable [...] part of the book is the detailed bibliography".
 
 Discusses change in research trends from 19th to 20th centuries, such as an increased emphasis of Catullus's personality. Sections include: "", "", "", "", "", "", and "".
 
 Has a bibliography ("") as well as bibliographies accompanying each poem. Bibliographies focus on sources pertaining to interpretation.

1960s

 
 Arranged by topic, with summaries and commentary. Sections include "Bibliographical Materials"; "Editions and Translations"; "Manuscript Studies"; "General Works on Catullus"; "Chronology of the Life and Writings of Catullus"; "The Circle of Catullus"; "Catullus and Earlier Writers: (Greek; Roman)"; "Influence on Later Writers"; "Studies on Meter", "Language and Style"; and "The Individual Poems". A supplement includes works Leon subsequently became aware of.
 
The third edition is the second edition with this supplement as an appendix.
 
 Reviews books and articles on Catullus from the period 1945–1959.
 
 Review of ten publications 1951–1961 on Roman elegy; surveys, books, and recent articles each have their own sections.
 
 Concerns the period 1950–1963. Separate sections for "", "", "", and "".
 
 Reviews seven works: 's 1957 edition of Catullus, five other editions of Catullus published between 1958 and 1963, and Kenneth Quinn's 1959 book The Catullan Revolution.
 
 Arranged chronologically within various subject-based categories. Unannotated. Updated version of Kroymann's bibliographies for Kroll's earlier editions of Catullus.

1970s

 
 Focuses on six works published between 1967 and 1970, including 's 1970 edition of Catullus.
 
 A continuation of Leon (1960). Includes 408 items, arranged by topic, with cursory summaries. Uses similar subject headings as Leon's survey. Includes a  supplement with approximately 150 items which fall under the purview of Leon's survey.
 
 A continuation of Van der Nat (1963–1965). It includes 135 entries with 1970 as its endpoint. Sections: "", "", "" (subsections: "", "", "", ""), and "".
 
 Reviews scholarship on Catullus 68 during the period 1959–1972.
  
 A monograph about Catullan metrics with a "particularly rich bibliographic documentation".
 
 
 Reviews previous decade of scholarship on Roman love elegy, with sections on Catullus, Tibullus, Propertius, and Ovid.
 
 Divided into five sections: "Text", "Translations", "Interpretations", "The Lesbia Poems", and "The Collection". Mostly concentrated to scholarship from the 1950s and later, but with a discussion on historical perspective.
 
 Includes 165 numbered entries within six sections: "", "", "", "", "", and ""; an author index is at the end of the volume. Provides summaries and commentary.
 
 Introduction to a collection of papers 1912–1973; review of how "unity" throughout Catullus's oeuvre became a concern of 20th century Catullan criticism, and how psychological, aesthetic, and chronological issues have been incorporated into this scholarship.
 
 A contemporary book review noted it has a "perfectly up to date bibliography". Covers up through 1975.
 
An unannotated bibliography including more than 2,900 entries dating back to 1500. Sources are listed chronologically within 17 main chapters. Entries include references to book reviews. Book contains three indices: passages, topics, and modern authors. Coverage mostly goes to 1976, with occasional works published in 1977.

1980s–1990s
 
 A contemporary book review noted its "very full and useful classified bibliography".
 
 Includes reviews of various editions, commentaries, and general studies of Catullus.
 
 Covers the period 1878–1981, with occasional items published in 1982 and 1983. Includes 3,111 items within nine chapters. Most entries are unannotated; some have very short descriptions. Includes an author index. Books often include table of contents as well as citations to book reviews. It also makes ample use of cross-referencing.
 
 Compiles sources related to poetic aspects: influences on Catullus, structures, use of language and style, and metrics.
 
 Each chapter of this survey summarizes the main scholarship on Catullus; the book also has a bibliography. Book has includes sources up through . Sections include: "Text", "Life of Catullus", "Did Catullus edit his own book?", "Literary Inheritance", "Catullus and his Weltanschauung", "The Lesbia Poems", "The Polymetrics", "The Elegiac Poems", "Translations", and "Influence".
 
 Contemporary book reviews said its bibliography was "detailed and useful" as well as "highly up-to-date and well-articulated". The final chapter, "", summarizes research on Catullus in France and Italy occurring from the 1940s to 1980s. 
 
 Provides a bibliographic, historical overview of Catullan studies. Focuses on various scholarly questions from the mid-20th century, including the transmission of the text, the overall structure of the collection, and psychological and spiritual aspects.
 
 A commentary on Catullus's . Bibliographic information appear throughout the book: an overview of editions and commentaries, a "Bibliography" (subdivided into "General" and "On the History of the Text"), a list of sources of emendations, and a bibliography for each poem. The sources for each poem go up through approximately 1993; the bibliographies for each poem are limited to sources specifically devoted to that poem versus sources which discuss individual poems in larger contexts.
 
 Reviews some focuses of 20th century Catullan scholarship: "Historical Context", "Callimacheanism", "Obscenity", "Sexuality and Gender". Bibliography only includes works written in English.

2000s–2010s

 
 Summarizes sources, grouped into eight thematic sections: "1. ", "2.  ", "3. ", "4. ", "5. ", "6. ", "7. ", and "8. ". Mostly, but not exclusively, focused on material written in Italian.
 
 The 2001 edition includes a "copious and valuable bibliographic update". Covers scholarship up through 2000. Includes summaries.
 
 Introduction to a collection of 28 papers on Catullus. Describes how obscenity, structure, the Neoteric movement, and allusion became a focus of Catulluan research during the 1980s and how Catullan scholars in the 1990s questioned and argued against many of the axioms of New Criticism.
 
 Thematically arranged bibliography on Clodia/Lesbia. The first part includes sources focused on Clodia/Lesbia in antiquity, including in Catullus's poetry; the second part is about the lasting influence of Clodia/Lesbia in literature.
 
 Provides commentary on sources, which are sorted into different thematic sections: "I. Bibliographies, Editions, Textual Criticism and Exegesis, and Commentaries", "II. General Studies", "III. Arrangement of the Corpus", and "IV. Critical Interpretations", themselves divided into further subcategories. Studies on individual poems are "not exhaustive and selected to show trends in opinions on key issues since the mid-1990s."
 
Addenda include additional works and indices of names, subjects, places, and manuscripts.

Online

 
 Primarily about the influence of Hellenistic poetry on Catullus, but works on related topics are also included.
 
 Has an alphabetical listing, followed by systematic groupings by reference types, research topics, and poems covered.
 
 Sources for Kiss's critical apparatus, which aims to compile every conjecture on Catullus since 1472. The bibliography contains 932 entries .
 Wikipedia contributors (2018). "Talk:Catullus/References". Wikipedia. Archived from the original on 8 Dec 2022.
 Created as part of the defunct WikiProject for Catullus. Categorized by poem; incomplete coverage.
 
 Includes a few, key publications for each of various subfields. An earlier version of this bibliography, edited only by Konstan, was made into an eBook.
 
 Sources relevant to scholarship on views of women, gender, and sexuality in classical antiquity. Sorted alphabetically by author.

Footnotes

Other editions

References

Works cited

 
 
 
 
 
 
 
 
 
 
 
 
 
 
 
 
 
 
 
 
 
 
 
 
 
 
 
 
 
 
 
 
 
 
 
 
 
 
 
 
 
 
 
 
 
 
 
 
 

Catullus
Bibliographies of reference works
Poetry bibliographies
Published bibliographies
Classics publications